McNulty is a surname of Irish origin. It is derived from the Gaelic Mac an Ultaigh meaning "son of the Ulsterman". Usually considered a branch of the Ulaid ruling dynasty of Mac Duinnshléibhe (MacDonlevy), a branch of Dál Fiatach, who fled Ulaid to Ailech after the former's conquest in 1177 by the Normans. DNA analysis points to descent from other Ulaid families as well. After the Battle of Kinsale in 1602, some McDonlevys and McNultys migrated to the province of Connacht where their name is now also common.

Origin
The name is said to have arisen from a branch of the ruling Ulaid dynasty of Mac Duinnshléibhe (MacDonlevy) who had migrated to what is now County Donegal in the Republic of Ireland after John de Courcy's conquest of Ulaid in 1177. Here some of the MacDonlevys were nicknamed Ultagh/Ultach. However, historical records such as the 1659 "Census" as well as Griffith's Valuation (1848-1864) show that concentrations of McNultys were found in parts of Ireland where the MacDonlevys had little presence, coupled with DNA analysis showing that the McNultys may actually derive from other Gaelic families that migrated from Ulaid and not just the MacDonlevy's. The names Ultagh/Ultach and Mac an Ultaigh applied to only those that fled Ulaid and was not used for those that remained.

Regardless of their actual origin, the first McNulty to be recorded is found in the Annals of the Four Masters under the year 1281, where an "Murtough Macan-Ulty" is listed as a distinguished fatality at the battle of Desertcreagh in present-day County Tyrone, Northern Ireland.

The probable transition of the name Mac an Ultaigh from the Ultagh MacDonlevy's can be seen around 1601 where one "Morris Ultagh" is recorded as "Morris m'Nich Ultagh". The surname prefix "m'Nich" appears to be an English confusion of the female prefix Nic with the male prefix Mac.

Other variant spellings of McNulty include McNaulty, McNalty, and rarely as O'Nalty, Nolty, McNult, McEnulty and McKnulty. and others.

In County Clare and its adjacent County Tipperary in the southwest of the Republic of Ireland, the toponymics Connoulty and Kinoulty are encountered, and are believed to be Anglicisations of Mac an Ultaigh.

Diaspora
By 1980, there were 19,469 persons surnamed McNulty in the United States Social Security Administration data base. The surname McNulty was, then, the 2332 most frequently occurring surname in that database. Some of the first McNulty immigrants to North America arrived in Philadelphia and New York City in the very early 19th century and, later, more numerously, in both Philadelphia and New York City between 1840 and 1860, during which period the Great Famine of Ireland occurred.

There are an estimated 421 persons surnamed McNulty in Australia. Denis McInulty, one of the first McNulty to arrive in Australia, arrived there from Scotland on 16 May 1846 on the prisoner transport the China under a 10-year sentence of the Glasgow Justiciary Court.

In the United Kingdom the surname McNulty is shared by an estimated 7,318 people and is approximately the 1,472th most popular surname in the country.

Notable McNultys

Actors
 Amybeth McNulty, Irish Canadian television actress
 Christina McNulty, Canadian silent film actress
 Danny McNulty, American actor
 Geraldine McNulty, English actress
 Jennie McNulty, American actress
 Kevin McNulty (actor), Canadian actor
 Marguerite McNulty, American actress
 Mariana McNulty, American actress who used the stage name Penny Singleton
 Matthew McNulty, English actor
 Neil McNulty, Scottish actor
 Owen Patrick Eugene McNulty, Irish actor who used the stage name Dennis Day
 Patricia McNulty, American actress

Musicians
 Ann McNulty, stage, radio and recording artist
 Chris McNulty, Australian jazz vocalist
 Daniel McNulty, Irish composer
 Mal McNulty, English musician
 Mario J. McNulty, American producer
 Paul McNulty (piano maker), American piano maker
 Thomas Francis McNulty, American composer

Military
 F. Lynn McNulty, American CIA operative
 James F. McNulty (rear admiral), American Navy rear admiral
 John McNulty (U.S. Marine Corps), American marine
 John J. McNulty, III, American soldier
 John R. McNulty, American soldier
 Richard R. McNulty, American Navy rear admiral
 William A. McNulty, American soldier

Politicians
 Anthony F. McNulty, American member of the Pennsylvania House of Representatives
 Caleb J. McNulty, American politician
 Clifford McNulty, American member of the Florida House of Representatives
 Des McNulty, Scottish politician
 Francis McNulty (Kansas politician), former state Representative
 Francis McNulty Jr., American politician
 Francis J. McNulty, former Delaware state Representative
 Frank McNulty (Colorado legislator), American politician
 Frank Joseph McNulty, American politician
 James McNulty (Canadian politician), Canadian politician
 James Barrett McNulty, American politician
 James F. McNulty Jr., American politician
 John F. McNulty, American politician
 John J. McNulty, American politician
 John J. McNulty Jr., American politician
 Joseph McNulty, American politician
 Justin McNulty, Irish politician and Gaelic football player
 Mark McNulty (politician), American politician
 Martin McNulty Crane, American politician
 Michael R. McNulty, former US Representative
 Paul McNulty, American politician
 Peter H. McNulty, American politician
 Raymond J. McNulty, American politician
 Tim McNulty (politician), American politician
 Thomas F. McNulty, American politician
 Tony McNulty, English politician
 William McNulty Brodhead, American politician

Sportspeople
 Arthur McNulty, English football player
 Bill McNulty, American baseball player
 Billy McNulty, Scottish football player
 Brandon McNulty, American cyclist
 Carl McNulty, American basketball player
 Dave McNulty, British swimming coach
 Enda McNulty, Irish Gaelic footballer
 Geoff McNulty, Canadian lacrosse player
 Jimmy McNulty (footballer), English footballer
 Jim McNulty (ice hockey), Canadian ice hockey player
 Joe McNulty, Irish footballer
 Joe McNulty (skier), American skier
 Joel McNulty, American hurdler
 John McNulty (American football), American football coach
 John F. McNulty Jr., American athletics coach
 Josh McNulty, English rugby player
 Marc McNulty, Scottish footballer
 Mark McNulty, Irish/Zimbabwean golfer
 Mike McNulty (boxing manager), American boxing manager
 Pat McNulty, American baseball player
 Pat McNulty (footballer), Australian rules football player
 Paul McNulty (American football), American football player
 Peter McNulty (Gaelic footballer), Irish Gaelic footballer
 Steve McNulty, English footballer
 Tim McNulty, Irish rally driver
 Thomas McNulty (footballer), English footballer

Writers
Bernard McNulty, Irish-American literary figure
 Charles McNulty, American journalist
 Edward McNulty, Irish novelist
 Faith McNulty, American author
 Fran McNulty, Irish journalist
 John McNulty (journalist), American journalist
 John K. McNulty, American legal scholar
 Phil McNulty, English sports writer

Other
 David L. McNulty, U.S. Marshal
 Deborah McNulty, American make-up artist
 Eileen McNulty, American tax commissioner
 Elizabeth McNulty, American beauty pageant titleholder, Miss Louisiana USA 2007, and Top 15 Miss USA 2007
 James McNulty (Irish activist), Irish republican
 James A. McNulty, the American priest
 James F. McNulty (chief executive), American businessman
 James J. McNulty, American businessman
 John McNulty (artist), Irish artist
 John McNulty (bishop), English priest
 John McNulty (steamboat captain), American sailor
 John L. McNulty, American priest
 Kathleen McNulty, Irish American computer programmer
 Kevin McNulty (judge), American judge
 Mary McNulty, American beauty pageant contestant
 Michelle McNulty, American TV producer
 Patrick J. McNulty, American judge
 Peter McNulty (film editor), American film editor
 Robert W. McNulty, American dentist
 Roy McNulty, Northern Irish businessman
 Sallie Keller McNulty, American statisticians
 William McNulty (relief organization founder), founder of disaster relief organization
 William Charles McNulty, American artist
 William N. McNulty, a Roman Catholic priest and the hero of the 1880 Garret Mountain May Day riot

Fictional characters

 Jimmy McNulty, a character on HBO drama The Wire
 Elena McNulty (Jimmy's estranged wife), Sean James McNulty (Jimmy's and Elena's eldest son) and Michael Barnes McNulty (Jimmy's and Elena's youngest son) also appear as characters on The Wire.
 Liam McNulty, a fictional character in BBC Scotland soap opera River City
 Middenface McNulty, post apocalyptic science fiction character
 McNulty Rugrats
 There are 7 McNulty characters in the Emmy nominated animated TV series.
 5 McNulty brother Rugrats (Timothy, Todd, Ty, Teddy and Terry)
 The brothers' grandfather Conan
 The brothers' mother Colleen
 Lt. Ray McNulty and his son Van McNulty are characters in the U.S. TV series Smallville
 Meet Mr. McNutley was a successful CBS television network series that ran 44 episodes from 1953 to 1955. The show's title and the last name of its main character were changed to "McNulty" in the second episode. The show was, later, again, retitled the Ray Milland Show. Milland played the show's main character Prof. Ray McNulty. The U.S. television actress Phyllis Avery played the professor's wife Peggy McNulty.
 The eye patched rogue and heel Red McNulty "of Dublin, Ireland" and the outright villain Ivan Koloff "The Russian Bear" were ring personas of Canadian wrestler Oreal Perras (Oreal James Perras), a former WWE World Heavyweight Champion who fought 3,962 documented career bouts. 
 Stephen Graham (actor) played the character Peter McNulty in 2 episodes of the TV series Jump.
 Thelma Ritter won the Oscar for Best Supporting Actress for her portrayal of Ellen McNulty in the 1951 film the Mating Season.
 Actress Gene Tierney played Maggie Carleton McNulty in the Mating Season (1951).
 There is a McNulty character in both the movie Trancers and its sequel Trancers II. In both movies the McNulty character is portrayed by actor Art LaFleur.
 Maggie Cline became famous in Vaudeville singing popular Irish songs, including How McNulty Carved His Duck.
 There is a Moshi Monsters moshling character in the puppies set named McNulty.
 Patrick McNulty, the main character in the Twilight Zone episode A Kind of a Stopwatch
 Lt. Nulty, Los Angeles, California police detective, a featured character in Raymond Chandler’s second Philip Marlowe detective novel, Farewell, My Lovely, which was thrice produced as a movie under various titles (1942, 1944, and 1975) and was adapted for radio broadcast.
In 23 episodes of the NBC television drama E-Ring, Dennis Hopper played the character Colonel Eli McNulty, who in story is a combat decorated former POW and Vietnam War veteran and principal staff officer of a “Special Operations Division”.

Places

McAnulty College and Graduate School of Liberal Arts, Duquesne University
McNulty Gulch near Leadville, Colorado in the U.S. Ten Mile Mining District.
McNulty Campus at the United States Merchant Marine Academy,  King's Point, New York, named after Vice Admiral Richard R. McNulty, the Academy's "father" and its third superintendent.
McNulty Hall, a residence hall at Johnson and Wales University in Providence, Rhode Island, is named after Lieutenant Colonel John F. McNulty, Jr., who was the University's Dean of Students for near 3 decades and its Athletic Director.
McNulty Hall, which is Seton Hall University's Technology and Research Center is named after Monsignor John L. McNulty, the University's 13th President.
McNulty Lake is a lake in Lee County, Arkansas
The community of McNulty, Oregon is named after Oregon pioneer John McNulty, as are the Warren, Oregon headquartered McNulty Water Association, which serves some 700 families in Columbia County, Oregon west of St. Helens, Oregon and McNulty Way in St. Helens, Oregon.
McNulty Reservoir Dam in Eagle County, Colorado, named after Colorado's McNulty family cattle ranchers, who settled in Eagle County, Colorado, in the 1880s, eventually, operating a 2500-acre cattle ranch there near Leadville, Colorado
McNulty Reservoir (Malheur County, Oregon), named after the Northwest US pioneer John McNulty.
Downtown McNulty Station in St. Petersburg, Florida is named after John T. McNulty, who became Chief of the St. Petersburg Fire Department in the year 1913.
Upper McNulty Reservoir in Oregon, US, named after Columbia River pioneer John McNulty.

McNulty rhyolite

Found in a single location on the earth's surface, that is McNulty Gulch near Leadville Colorado, McNulty rhyolite is a comparatively rare gem rock quality variety of rhyolite rock. McNulty rhyolite appears in the official U.S. Department of Interior, United States Geological Survey Lexicon of Geological Names of the United States.

Nulty
This is a variant of McNulty. Notable bearers of the name are:

 Mark Nulty (born 1967), former Irish cricketer 
 Thomas Nulty (1818-1898), Bishop of Meath, Ireland

See also
List of Celtic tribes
Irish medical families
Irish royal families
List of Irish kingdoms
Fiatach Finn
Dál Fiatach
Haughey
Hoey
Clan MacLea
Livingstone (name)
O'Donnell dynasty
Ó Duinnshléibhe

References

External links
Genealogy of the kings of the Ulaid
 Emmy TV Legends, Television Academy Foundation, Archive of American Television interview with Barney McNulty with video and audio
 Bio of Barney McNulty, the "Cue Card King", with photo from official web page of Lets Make A Deal television program
 Here courtesy of Motor Marques is a 1938 photograph of Australian automotive manufacturer, racer, engineer and designer William "Bill" Conoulty racing his "Conoulty Special Austin Comet".
 Here for view courtesy of BBC is Clare Collas' oil on canvas portrait of Dr. Sir Arthur Salusbury MacNalty in elder life, hanging in the collection of the Royal College of Physicians, London
 Here is the UK National Health Service official site's photograph portrait of Dr. Sir Arthur Salusbury MacNalty (there listed as Arthur McNalty #8) along with portraits of all of the other of the UK's Chief Medical Officers since Victorian times.
 Here are several photographs of the USS McNulty (DE 581) and a photograph in naval uniform of that ship's namesake Lt. (j.g.) John Thomas McNulty, from navsource.org.

Surnames of Irish origin
Irish families
History of Northern Ireland
Irish-American history
Destroyers of the United States Navy
Vietnam War auxiliary ships
Naval War College
United States Merchant Marine Academy
Irish medical families